In computing, a system resource, or simple resource, is any physical or virtual component of limited availability within a computer system. All connected devices and internal system components are resources. Virtual system resources include files (concretely file handles), network connections (concretely network sockets), and memory areas. 

Managing resources is referred to as resource management, and includes both preventing resource leaks (not releasing a resource when a process has finished using it) and dealing with resource contention (when multiple processes wish to access a limited resource). Computing resources are used in cloud computing to provide services through networks.

Major resource types 
 Interrupt request (IRQ) lines
 Direct memory access (DMA) channels
 Port-mapped I/O
 Memory-mapped I/O
 Locks
 External devices
 External memory or objects, such as memory managed in native code, from Java; or objects in the Document Object Model (DOM), from JavaScript

General resources 
 CPU, both time on a single CPU and use of multiple CPUs – see multitasking
 Random-access memory and virtual memory – see memory management
 Hard disk drives, include space generally, contiguous free space (such as for swap space), and use of multiple physical devices ("spindles"), since using multiple devices allows parallelism
 Cache space, including CPU cache and MMU cache (translation lookaside buffer)
 Network throughput
 Electrical power
 Input/output operations
 Randomness

Categories 
Some resources, notably memory and storage space, have a notion of "location", and one can distinguish contiguous allocations from non-contiguous allocations. For example, allocating 1 GB of memory in a single block, versus allocating it in 1,024 blocks each of size 1 MB. The latter is known as fragmentation, and often severely impacts performance, so contiguous free space is a subcategory of the general resource of storage space.

One can also distinguish compressible resources from incompressible resources. Compressible resources, generally throughput ones such as CPU and network bandwidth, can be throttled benignly: the user will be slowed proportionally to the throttling, but will otherwise proceed normally. Other resources, generally storage ones such as memory, cannot be throttled without either causing failure (if a process cannot allocate enough memory, it typically cannot run) or severe performance degradation, such as due to thrashing (if a working set does not fit into memory and requires frequent paging, progress will slow significantly). The distinction is not always sharp; as mentioned, a paging system can allow main memory (primary storage) to be compressed (by paging to hard drive (secondary storage)), and some systems allow discardable memory for caches, which is compressible without disastrous performance impact. Electrical power is to some degree compressible: without power (or without sufficient voltage) an electrical device cannot run, and will stop or crash, but some devices, notably mobile phones, can allow degraded operation at reduced power consumption, or can allow the device to be suspended but not terminated, with much lower power consumption.

See also 
 Computational resource
 Linear scheduling method
 Sequence step algorithm
 System monitor

References 

Resources
Computing terminology